Julián Antonio Fernández (born December 5, 1995) is a Dominican professional baseball pitcher for the Toronto Blue Jays organization. He made his Major League Baseball debut in 2021 for the Colorado Rockies.

Career

Colorado Rockies
Fernández signed with the Colorado Rockies in 2012 as an international free agent. He made his professional debut in 2013 with the Rookie-level DSL Rockies where he compiled a 1–1 win-loss record and a 7.94 earned run average (ERA) in ten games. In 2014, he returned to the DSL, posting a 1–0 record and 5.60 ERA in 18 relief appearances, and in 2015, he split time between the DSL and the Rookie-level Grand Junction Rockies, pitching to a combined 3–2 record, 3.55 ERA and 1.11 WHIP in 28 total games between the two clubs. He spent 2016 with the Low-A Boise Hawks, going 1–2 with a 1.17 ERA in 21 appearances out of the bullpen. He spent the 2017 season with the Single-A Asheville Tourists, posting a 1–2 record and 3.26 ERA with 57 strikeouts in 51 games.

The San Francisco Giants selected Fernández from the Colorado Rockies organization with the second pick in the 2017 Rule 5 draft. He underwent Tommy John surgery and missed the 2018 season. On November 19, 2018, Fernández was claimed off waivers by the Miami Marlins. Fernández spent the 2019 season on the 60–day injured list and did not appear in a game, as he suffered a set-back with more elbow issues during the year. On October 19, 2019, Fernández was removed from the Marlins 40-man roster and returned to the Rockies organization. He did not play a minor league game in 2020 since the season was cancelled due to the COVID-19 pandemic.

In 2021, Fernández pitched for the Double-A Hartford Yard Goats and the Triple-A Albuquerque Isotopes. The Rockies promoted Fernández to the major leagues on September 1. He made his MLB debut on September 5, allowing three earned runs in  innings against the Atlanta Braves. 

Fernández was designated for assignment on June 11, 2022. He cleared waivers on June 16 and was sent outright to Triple-A Albuquerque. On October 12, Fernández elected free agency.

Toronto Blue Jays
On December 29, 2022, Fernández signed a minor league contract with the Toronto Blue Jays.

See also
Rule 5 draft results

References

External links

1995 births
Living people
Albuquerque Isotopes players
Asheville Tourists players
Boise Hawks players
Colorado Rockies players
Dominican Republic expatriate baseball players in the United States
Dominican Summer League Rockies players
Grand Junction Rockies players
Major League Baseball pitchers
Major League Baseball players from the Dominican Republic
People from Santo Domingo Province
Hartford Yard Goats players